Peptacetobacter hiranonis is a Gram-positive, cellulolytic and  motile bacterium from the family Peptostreptococcaceae which has been isolated from human faeces in Okinawa in Japan.

References

 

Bacteria described in 2001
Peptostreptococcaceae